Sanjeev may refer to:

Sanjeev (Tamil actor, born 1975) (born Sanjeev Venkatasubramanian)
Sanjeev (Tamil actor, born 1989)
Sanjeev Kumar, Indian actor
Sanjeev Bhaskar, British Indian comedian
Sanjeev Nanda, Indian businessman
Sanjeev Kohli, Scottish Asian comedian
Sanjeev Abhyankar, Hindustani classical vocalist
Sanjeev Naik, Mayor of Navi Mumbai
Sanjeev Arora, computer scientist 
Sanjeev Kapoor, Indian chef
Sanjeev Chattopadhyay, fiction writer
Sanjeev Chimmalgi, Hindustani vocalist 
Sanjeev Sharma, former cricketer
Sanjeev Raja, Indian politician
Sanjeev Rajput, Indian shooter
Sanjeev Rathod, Indian music director
Sudeep Sanjeev, Indian actor